His Story is the second studio album by South Korean rapper MC Mong, released on May 16, 2005, by Fantom Entertainment Korea.

Track listing
"Intro" – 0:57
"청춘 (Youth)" – 4:06
"인생 12진법 - 일동차렷" – 3:30
"엠씨몽 (DRAMA)" – 4:17
"천하무적 (Invincible)" – 3:28
"SKIT01" – 3:04
"Mong's Party - 부비부비" – 3:49
"My Bro" – 3:51
"SKIT02" – 1:36
"지우개 (Eraser)" – 3:29
"I LOVE U OH THANK U" – 4:09
"1st Love" – 4:09
"On the Radio" – 3:37
"오른쪽 왼쪽 (Mong in da Club)" – 4:29
"Jonathan - 갈매기의  꿈" – 4:15
"홈런 (Home Run)" – 3:20
"Outro" – 0:39

2005 albums
Korean-language albums
MC Mong albums